Henry Gotlieb "Dutch" Kirkgard (September 2, 1898 – February 26, 1967) was an American football player.  A Texas native, he played college football at Trinity (TX), Centre, and SMU and professional football as a halfback for the Toledo Maroons in the National Football League (NFL). He appeared in five NFL games, three as a starter, during the 1923 season.

References

1898 births
1967 deaths
Toledo Maroons players
Centre Colonels football players
SMU Mustangs football players